was a Japanese freestyle swimmer. At the 1936 Olympics he won the gold medal in the 1500 m event with a margin of 10 seconds. In 1994 he was inducted into the International Swimming Hall of Fame.

See also
 List of members of the International Swimming Hall of Fame

References

1917 births
1986 deaths
Olympic swimmers of Japan
Olympic gold medalists for Japan
Swimmers at the 1936 Summer Olympics
Japanese male freestyle swimmers
Medalists at the 1936 Summer Olympics
Olympic gold medalists in swimming
20th-century Japanese people